The River Terrig is a small river in north-east Wales.

The river rises at Llyn Cyfynwy near Graianrhyd village in the community of Llanarmon-yn-Ial, Denbighshire, about three miles from the source of the River Alyn. It then flows northwards and eastwards, forming the boundary between the old parishes of Nercwys and Treuddyn. At Nant-y-Mynydd it is joined by several small springs from Mynydd Ddu, and finally itself joins the River Alyn at Pontblyddyn, Flintshire.

The Terrig is a habitat for brown trout. Its name is derived from its rapid flow after times of heavy rain; Thomas Pennant, in his Tours in Wales, described it as "the Terrig, or the violent, [...] often of a tremendous swell and fury".

References

Terrig
Terrig
2Terrig